Joseph Lux (1 May 1879 – 13 March 1960) was a French gymnast. On 1 May 1879, Lux was born in Thaon-les-Vosges, France.

Career 
In 1903, Lux took part in the first gymnastics World Championships, where he took gold in the team competition and silver overall, behind Joseph Martinez. Lux also took gold in the pommel horse and silver in the rings.  In 1907, when Lux won silver in the team competition and gold in the individual parallel bars. He competed in the men's artistic individual all-around event at the 1908 Summer Olympics.

Personal life 
On 30 March 1960, Lux died in Girmont, France. He was 80.

References 

 

1879 births
1960 deaths
French male artistic gymnasts
Olympic gymnasts of France
Gymnasts at the 1908 Summer Olympics
Place of birth missing
World champion gymnasts
Medalists at the World Artistic Gymnastics Championships
Sportspeople from Vosges (department)
20th-century French people